The University of Florence (Italian: Università degli Studi di Firenze, UniFI) is an Italian public research university located in Florence, Italy. It comprises 12 schools and has around 50,000 students enrolled.

History
The first university in Florence was the Studium Generale, which was established by the Florentine Republic in 1321. The Studium was recognized by Pope Clement VI in 1349, and authorized to grant regular degrees. The Pope also established that the first Italian faculty of theology would be in Florence. The Studium became an imperial university in 1364, but was moved to Pisa in 1473 when Lorenzo the Magnificent gained control of Florence. Charles VIII moved it back from 1497 to 1515, but it was moved to Pisa again when the Medici family returned to power.

The modern university dates from 1859, when a group of disparate higher-studies institutions grouped together in the Istituto di Studi Pratici e di Perfezionamento, which a year later was recognized as a full-fledged university by the government of newly unified Italy. In 1923, the Istituto was officially denominated as University by the Italian Parliament.

Organization
The university is subdivided into 12 schools, which are: Agriculture; Architecture; Arts; Economics; Education; Engineering; Law; Mathematics, Physics and Natural Sciences; Medicine and Surgery; Pharmacology; Political Science; and Psychology.

Faculties are located in traditionally strategic areas based on their subject matter. The Faculty of Economics, Faculty of Law and the Faculty of Political Sciences are in the Polo delle Scienze Sociali (campus of social sciences), in the Novoli district, near the new courthouse. The Faculty of Medicine and Surgery, the Faculty of Pharmacology, and certain scientific and engineering departments are in the Careggi district, close to the hospital. The Faculty of Engineering is located at the S. Marta Institute, whereas the Faculty of Agriculture is in front of the Parco delle Cascine. The Faculty of Mathematical, Physical and Natural Sciences is located in Sesto Fiorentino. The Faculty of Architecture is in the center of the city, as the Accademia di Belle Arti, home of Michelangelo's David. The Faculties of Literature, History, Philosophy, and Pedagogy are in the centre of Florence.

Corporate relations 
Florence has a wide network of corporate placement opportunities for its students. Florence has recently collaborated internationally with TreeAndHumanKnot, part of the RisingIndia ThinkTank which provides opportunities abroad for its students.

School of Law 
The University hosts one of the leading Italian law schools, repeatedly recognised as a national "Department of Excellence" by the Italian Ministry of Education, University, and Research. Alumni and faculty members of the University of Florence School of Law have held leading positions in government. They include Presidents of the Italian Constitutional Court Silvana Sciarra, Paolo Grossi, Ugo de Siervo, and Enzo Cheli, President of the International Criminal Tribunal for the former Jugoslavia and Special Tribunal for Lebanon Antonio Cassese, Judge of the International Court of Justice Giorgio Gaja, Judge of the Court of Justice of the European Union Roberto Mastroianni, former Prime Ministers of the Italian Republic Matteo Renzi and Giuseppe Conte, and members of the Constituent Assembly Piero Calamandrei and Giorgio La Pira.

Notable people

Alumni

Notable alumni of the University of Florence include:

Italian journalists Indro Montanelli, Oriana Fallaci, Nadia Toffa
Former Governor General of Canada and current Secretary-General of La Francophonie Michaëlle Jean
Pope Pius II
Italian Prime Ministers Giovanni Spadolini, Lamberto Dini and Matteo Renzi
Italian political leaders Giorgio La Pira
Architect Pier Carlo Bontempi
President of the European Parliament, David Sassoli.
Architect Hamid Gabbay
Astrophysicist Margherita Hack
Immunologist Paola Ricciardi-Castagnoli
Philosopher Giacomo Marramao
United Nations official Annalisa Ciampi
Poets Margherita Guidacci and Mario Luzi
Doctor Francesco Antommarchi, personal doctor of Napoleon
Judge Abdulqawi Ahmed Yusuf of the International Court of Justice
Philosopher Giovanni Gentile
Indian Luge Player Shiva Keshavan
Francesco Milleri, CEO of Luxottica
Giulio Racah, Acting President of the Hebrew University of Jerusalem
Mirella Levi D'Ancona, art historian

Faculty

 John Argyropoulos taught Greek from 1456.
 Raphael Badius, dean in 1681
 Carlo Emilio Bonferroni, statistician
 Giovanni Boccaccio, poet, professor of Ancient Greek and Literature
 Piero Calamandrei, jurist, professor in the faculty of law, born in 1889.
 Antonio Cassese, international jurist, president of several international tribunals
 Mario Draghi, prime minister of Italy from 2021, President of ECB, full professor of Monetary Economics and Monetary Policy in the faculty of Political Science from 1981 to 1991.
 Enrico Fermi, physicist and Nobel prize, professor of Mathematical Physics
 Giorgio Gaja, international jurist, former member of the International Law Commission and judge of the International Court of Justice
 Paolo Grossi, judge of the Constitutional Court of Italy
 Mario Luzi, poet, professor of French language and Literature
 Giovanni Sartori, political scientist, professor of Political Science, born in 1924 in Florence.
 Giovanni Spadolini, historian and important Italian politician, professor of Contemporary History, born in 1925 in Florence.
 Leonardo da Vinci carried out studies on anatomy at the Santa Maria Nuova Hospital in the center of town which is today a teaching hospital affiliated with the University of Florence.
Giuseppe Conte, prime minister of Italy from 2018 to 2021, teaches private law

Points of interest 
 Museo Galileo
 Museo di Storia Naturale di Firenze
 Orto Botanico di Firenze

See also 
 List of forestry universities and colleges
 List of Italian universities
 List of medieval universities

References

External links 
  University of Florence website / English version
 Faculty of Agriculture
 Faculty of Architecture
 Faculty of Economics
 Faculty of Education
 Faculty of Engineering
 Faculty of Law
 Faculty of Mathematics, Physics and Natural Sciences
 Faculty of Medicine and Surgery
 Faculty of Pharmacology
 Faculty of Political Science
 Faculty of Psychology

 
Buildings and structures in Florence
Universities and colleges in Florence
1321 establishments in Europe
14th-century establishments in the Republic of Florence
Educational institutions established in the 14th century